Coinjock is an unincorporated community and census-designated place (CDP) in Currituck County, North Carolina, United States. As of the 2010 census it had a population of 335. Church's Island to the east of Coinjock in the Currituck Sound has a village called Waterlily, which uses the postal address of Coinjock as well. The island's name is due to a decayed church that was once a landmark of the tiny community. Coinjock is bordered by Currituck Sound to the east; the North River lies to the west. Its ZIP code is 27923.

The name Coinjock is of Native American origin, meaning "the place of the blueberry swamps", referring to the swamp blueberries native to the county. The name has also been spelled "Coenjock", "Cowenjock", or "Cornjack", and sometimes as two words with the second beginning with a capital J. Bishop Thomas Coke visited Coenjock, as he called it, and preached to a small congregation in its chapel on March 19, 1785.

The Coinjock Colored School was listed on the National Register of Historic Places in 2013.

Demographics

References

Census-designated places in Currituck County, North Carolina
Census-designated places in North Carolina